Scelorchilus is a genus of bird in the family Rhinocryptidae.

Species
It contains the following species:

References

 
Taxa named by Harry C. Oberholser
Taxonomy articles created by Polbot